George Henry Sullivan (December 20, 1867 – February 15, 1935) was the 21st Lieutenant Governor of Minnesota. Born in Stillwater, Minnesota, he became lieutenant governor when Joseph A. A. Burnquist was elevated to governor upon the death of Winfield Scott Hammond. He served from October 28, 1916, to January 2, 1917. 

He died in 1935 in Mahtomedi, Minnesota.

References
Minnesota Historical Society
Minnesota Legislators Past and Present

1867 births
1935 deaths
Lieutenant Governors of Minnesota
Republican Party Minnesota state senators
People from Stillwater, Minnesota